Malacca College of Complementary Medicine (MCCM) is the first college of its kind in Malaysia teaching complementary and natural medicine in the country. The college was founded in Melaka in June 2008.

The college provides course leading to diploma in Natural Medicine. The college is approved by the Ministry of Higher Education, Malaysia and the Malaysian Qualifications Agency (MQA).

The college has an organic farm in Kesang Pajak, Melaka; a complementary medical center in Melaka city; and a naturopathy center in Ayer Keroh, Melaka.

External links
 Malacca College of Complementary Medicine
The courses offered are with provisional approval. The MQA website doesn't have the courses listed yet.

Colleges in Malaysia
Universities and colleges in Malacca
Educational institutions established in 2008
2008 establishments in Malaysia